Mougin is a surname. Notable people with the surname include:

Eugène Mougin (1852–1923), French archer
Henri-Louis-Philippe Mougin (1841–1916), French military engineer
Nicolas Mougin (born 1979), French vert skater
Mougin brothers, French sculptors and ceramists

See also
Mougin turret, a French gun turret
Mougins, a commune in Alpes-Maritimes, France